Henry Coffin Carlisle (September 14, 1926 – July 11, 2011) was a translator, novelist, and anti-censorship activist.

Carlisle, with his wife Olga Andreyeva Carlisle, was notable for translating Alexander Solzhenitsyn's work into English.  Although Solzhenitsyn criticized the translations, Olga Carlisle felt they helped bring his work to a wider audience, and contributed to Solzhenitsyn's Nobel Prize.

Carlisle was president of PEN American Center (elected 1976), and actively supported writers facing censorship.

Novels
 Ilyitch Slept Here (1965)
 The Contract (1968)
 The Somers Mutiny (1972)
 Voyage to the First of December (1972)
 The Land Where the Sun Dies (1975)
 The Jonah Man (1984)
 The Idealists (1999) (with Olga Carlisle)

Translations
 The First Circle by Aleksandr Solzhenitsyn (with Olga Carlisle)
 The Gulag Archipelago by Aleksandr Solzhenitsyn (with Olga Carlisle)
 The Idiot by Fyodor Dostoevsky (1978, with Olga Carlisle)

Notes

Further reading
 Far from Russia: A Memoir by Olga Andreyeva Carlisle (2000)

External links 
 Henry Carlisle's works at The New York Review of Books

1926 births
2011 deaths
Russian–English translators
20th-century American novelists
Free speech activists
American activists
20th-century American translators
American male novelists
20th-century American male writers